Ernest "Ernie" Price (12 May 1926 – 25 February 2013) was an English footballer who made 103 appearances in the Football League playing for Darlington and Crystal Palace in the years following the Second World War. A wing half, he began his career with Sunderland, but never represented that club in the League, and also played non-league football for Weymouth, Bideford and Taunton. He was player-manager of Taunton for several years.

Life and career
Price was born in Easington, County Durham, and worked as a police officer. He began his football career on the books of Sunderland, but never played for them in the Football League, and joined Third Division North club Darlington in 1948. After three seasons and 69 League appearances he signed for Crystal Palace of the Southern Section. He played around half of Palace's matches in the 1951–52 season, five the next, and then moved into non-league football in the south-west of England.

After brief spells with Weymouth and Bideford, Price was appointed player-manager of Western League Second Division club Taunton in 1954. In his second season, he led them to promotion to First Division as runners-up, and managed then for five more years in the bottom half of the higher division. He became a director of the club in 1982.

Price and wife Joyce had two children. He died in Musgrove Park Hospital, Taunton, Somerset, on 25 February 2013 at the age of 86.

References

1926 births
2013 deaths
Sportspeople from Easington, County Durham
Footballers from County Durham
English footballers
Association football forwards
Sunderland A.F.C. players
Darlington F.C. players
Crystal Palace F.C. players
Weymouth F.C. players
Bideford A.F.C. players
Taunton Town F.C. players
English Football League players
English football managers